Buccaneer Bunny is a 1948 Looney Tunes cartoon directed by Friz Freleng. The short was released on May 8, 1948, and features Bugs Bunny and Yosemite Sam.

Plot
The cartoon opens with titles featuring an instrumental of "The Sailor's Hornpipe" (also one of the theme songs to the Popeye cartoon series), seguéing to a scene of Sam digging a hole to bury his treasure on a beach. Sam is singing the stereotypical pirate shanty "Dead Man's Chest"—on the second strain, Sam switches from the typical "yo-ho-ho and a bottle of rum!" to a decidedly more original "yo-ho-ho and a bottle of... Ma's old fashioned ci-der" with a conga kick on the last syllable and a parody of "Dad's Old-Fashioned Root Beer", a well-known radio advertising jingle at that time.

In attempting to bury his treasure, Sam has encroached on Bugs' domain, as Bugs happens to have his rabbit hole there on the beach. When Bugs asks him who he is, he responds in his typical way: "What's up, doc?! I ain't no doc! I'm a pirate! Sea-Goin' Sam, the blood-thirstiest, shoot-'em-first-iest, doggone worst-iest buccaneer has ever sailed the Spanish main!"

To protect the location of his treasure, Sam prepares to shoot Bugs, claiming "Dead rabbits tell no tales!" Bugs then temporarily tricks Sam into trying to shoot himself in the head by saying: "Now, just a minute, Red. Ain't you got that wrong? You mean dead men tell no tales." After realizing he's been tricked, Sam grounds his teeth together so hard they shatter before he fires at Bugs.

Bugs escapes in a tied lifeboat, at one point rowing himself towards a ship without the boat. Following, Sam swims towards the ship to retrieve the paddles from where Bugs left them (oblivious that he doesn't even need them since he already made it to the ship without them), then returns to the lifeboat, which he then rows back to the ship.
 
As Sam searches for Bugs on the ship, he sees Bugs disguised as Captain Bligh (effecting the voice and thick-lipped appearance of Charles Laughton in his portrayal of Bligh in Mutiny On The Bounty). Sam takes criticism from "Captain Bligh" before being ordered a bunch of chores. Sam soon realizes he's been tricked (again), and follows a fleeing Bugs, but crashes into the mast while doing so.

In a side gag, Bugs is trying to hide and a pesky parrot keeps crowing to Sam, "He's in there! He's in there! Awk!" Finally, Bugs asks the parrot, "Polly want a cracker?" The parrot changes his tune, "Polly want a cracker! Polly want a cracker! Awk!" Bugs hands him a lit firecracker, which promptly explodes, blasting all of the parrot's feathers off, leaving him dazed and smoldering. His last words before he passes out are, "Me and my big mouth!" For the next part, Bugs poses as the now-unconscious parrot to lead Sam into a cannon. Bugs lights the fuse, and then, "KABOOM!" The cannon explodes and Sam falls out of the barrel.

In a series of gags that mildly anticipate the Wile E. Coyote and the Road Runner series, Bugs is in the crow's nest and Sam tries various unsuccessful attempts to get to him; Bugs told him that the elevator is out of order and tosses him a rope. But, when Sam climbs up, he climbs back down and crashes on the ground below. For his next attempt, he made a seesaw, and puts a ball on it, but that kind of failed too. In another one, that skirts the laws of physics, Bugs tells Sam he's going to jump. Instead, Bugs drops a convenient anvil over the side of the crow's nest, Sam catches it, and the anvil's momentum causes the entire ship ("except for the crow's nest") to submerge. Sam mouths some apparent curses underwater, then tosses the anvil overboard and the ship resurfaces.

When Bugs comes down to check on Sam, Sam proceeds to attack him with his sword, making Bugs mad that he's "sore again". Bugs crawls in a hatch in the ship's side, with Sam following with his sword: "Ooooh, I'll keelhaul you for this!". When he opens the board, he is blasted by a cannon. Bugs opens the hatch to Sam's left and calls: "Yoo-hoo! Mr. Pirate!". Sam opens that board and, again, gets blasted by a cannon. Bugs opens another hatch and calls: "Oh, uh, Redbeard!". Sam, trying to avoid getting blasted again, decides to open up the hatch with his sword from a safe distance. Nothing there. Suddenly, another hatch opens in his face and a cannon blasts Sam once more, much to his annoyance.

Sam now chases Bugs again, and is now subjected to the lots-of-doors in-and-out routine (previously used in Little Red Riding Rabbit), which ends with Sam getting blasted by a cannon again. Sam confronts Bugs, who throws a match into the powder room, which a panicking Sam swiftly retrieves (a gag that would later be recycled into 1954's Captain Hareblower). This is repeated until finally, Sam is too late to retrieve the match that ends up exploding the entire pirate ship when he refused to go after another match again, reducing the ship to splinters. On his last nerve, Sam furiously chases Bugs with his gun: "ooooh, I'll blast your head off for this!" until he seemingly has Bugs defeated ("Alright, now! I got ya cornered! Come out and meet your doom!") until a cannon blasts him once more. Finally, defeated, Sam raises the white flag and Bugs turns to the audience, puts on an old-style ship captain's hat, and paraphrases John Paul Jones, "I have not even begun to fight!" and he laughs.

Additional Crew
 Film Edited by Treg Brown
 Uncredited Orchestration by Milt Franklyn

Reception
Animation historian David Gerstein writes, "In Buccaneer Bunny, Sam out-Sams himself by turning a sea shanty into a rhumba and by gritting his teeth so hard that they break. The trappings of piracy become part of the show, with booming cannons, ascending crow's nests, and stoolie parrots, all of which deliver an in-your-face impact that few other Sam stories could offer."

Home media
VHS - Cartoon Moviestars: Starring Bugs Bunny!
Laserdisc - Cartoon Moviestars: Bugs Bunny Classics: Special Collector's Edition
 VHS - Bugs Bunny Collection: Bugs Bunny's Zaniest Toons
Laserdisc - The Golden Age of Looney Tunes, Vol. 4, Side 1: Bugs Bunny
 DVD - Looney Tunes Golden Collection: Volume 5, Disc 1
 DVD - Looney Tunes Spotlight Collection: Volume 5, Disc 1
 DVD, Blu-ray - Looney Tunes Platinum Collection: Volume 1, Disc 1

See also
 Looney Tunes and Merrie Melodies filmography (1940–1949)
 List of Bugs Bunny cartoons
 List of Yosemite Sam cartoons

References

External links

The cartoon

1948 films
1948 short films
1948 animated films
1940s Warner Bros. animated short films
Short films directed by Friz Freleng
Looney Tunes shorts
Pirate films
Films scored by Carl Stalling
Animated films about animals
Bugs Bunny films
Yosemite Sam films
Films with screenplays by Michael Maltese